Tilurium was an Illyrian fortified settlement of the Delmatae. Tilurium was the location a Roman cohort in the territory of the Delmatae. The site is now located on the hill of Gardun near Trilj.

See also 
List of ancient cities in Illyria

References 

Former populated places in the Balkans
Cities in ancient Illyria
Illyrian Croatia
Archaeology of Illyria
Roman fortifications in Roman Dalmatia
Roman towns and cities in Croatia